Beregama cordata, sometimes called the fire-back huntsman, is a species of spider endemic to Queensland and New South Wales, Australia. It is a member of the genus Beregama of huntsman spiders.

Description 
This spider was identified thanks largely to the work of D. B. Hirst. It closely resembles Beregama aurea. It also resembles several other Australian huntsman spiders, especially species from the genus Neosparassus, although it lacks the black patch on the underpart of the abdomen which is found on Neosparassus members.

References

External links 

 "Fire-back Huntsman, Beregama cordata - Care guide". Minibeast Wildlife. Retrieved 30 October 2022.

Sparassidae
Spiders of Australia
Spiders described in 1875
Fauna of Queensland
Fauna of New South Wales